Nordic Chinese Christian Church (NCCC,) is a collaboration of Chinese churches/congregations in Northern Europe, with the largest ones being in Stockholm, Gothenburg, Malmö in Sweden, Oslo, Stavanger in Norway and Helsinki in Finland. It was up until 2010 called Scandinavia Chinese Christian Church, but with the inclusion of the Chinese church in Finland, found it better to change the name to the current one.

External links
NCCC official portal
NCCC in Stockholm, Sweden
NCCC in Helsinki, Finland
NCCC in Gothenburg, Sweden
NCCC in Malmö, Sweden
NCCC in Oslo, Norway

Churches in Sweden
Churches in Norway